Platinum Collection is the third greatest hits album released by pop group Steps. The album was released on 19 August 2022 through Sony Music Entertainment. The album is to mark the twenty fifth anniversary of the group's formation back in 1997. The album features Steps' greatest hits along with two brand new songs; "Hard 2 Forget", and "The Runner".

Background and promotion
On June 1, 2022, Steps announced they would be releasing their third greatest hits album “Platinum Collection” to celebrate 25 years in the music industry and since their formation in 1997. Following the announcement of the upcoming release, group members Lisa Scott-Lee, and Faye Tozer, were interviewed with Official Charts Company. Both Scott-Lee and Tozer expressed their happiness with the 25th anniversary of the group, stating “It’s nice for us to spread a little happiness. I think Steps add a certain sparkle to the world.” Also stating “This anniversary marks the perfect moment to take a look back at everything we’ve achieved as a band. We realised that we’ve released a full 3 new studio albums since our last Greatest Hits so it felt like time to combine all our hits on one package. We’ve recorded two brand-new tracks for the album and hay presto, the Platinum Collection was born. It was such good fun listening back at 25 years of our songs and we hope you enjoy this trip down memory lane as much we did.”

Singles
The group appeared on BBC1's The One Show on the same day to promote the release of the album and the "Platinum Megamix" single that was released on the same day of the announcement. 

On 7 July 2022, Steps released the first official single from the compilation, "Hard 2 Forget", a cover of the 2020 Vincint song. The official music video premiered at 2pm BST on the same day. After less than 24 hours of release, the single debuted at 21 on the UK Official Singles Downloads Top 100 Chart on 8 July 2022.

Chart performance
On 26 August, the album entered the UK Album Chart at number one with sales of 24,132 copies.

Track listing 

Pre Party Edition
 "5, 6, 7, 8"
 "Better Best Forgotten"
 "Better the Devil You Know"
 "Chain Reaction"
 "Deeper Shade of Blue" (Radio Edit)
 "Hard 2 Forget"
 "Heartbeat"
 "It's the Way You Make Me Feel"
 "Last Thing on My Mind"
 "Love's Got a Hold on My Heart"
 "One for Sorrow"
 "Stomp"
 "Summer of Love"
 "The Runner" (Steps Platinum Version)
 "Tragedy"
 "Something in Your Eyes"
 "What the Future Holds" (Single Mix)
 "Heartbreak in This City" (Single Mix)
 "Neon Blue"
 "Scared of the Dark"
 "Story of a Heart"
 "Deeper Shade of Blue" (Steps 25 Revisited Mix)
 "It’s The Way You Make Me Feel" (Demo)
 "Here And Now" (FAF Radio Mix)
 "Tragedy" (WIP Extended Mix)
 "Heartbeat (Steps 25 Revisited Mix)
 "Better The Devil You Know" (JRMX Radio Mix)
 "Only In My Dreams" (Alternate Demo)
 "A Hundred Years Of Winter" (7th Heaven Radio Mix)
 "Never Get Over You" (Wembley Tour Mix)
 "Summer Of Love" (Steps 25 Revisited Mix)

Party Edition
 "5, 6, 7, 8"
 "Better Best Forgotten"
 "Better the Devil You Know"
 "Chain Reaction"
 "Deeper Shade of Blue" (Radio Edit)
 "Hard 2 Forget"
 "Heartbeat"
 "It's the Way You Make Me Feel"
 "Last Thing on My Mind"
 "Love's Got a Hold on My Heart"
 "One for Sorrow"
 "Stomp"
 "Summer of Love"
 "The Runner" (Steps Platinum Version)
 "Tragedy"
 "Something in Your Eyes"
 "What the Future Holds" (Single Mix)
 "Heartbreak in This City" (Single Mix)
 "Neon Blue"
 "Scared of the Dark"
 "Story of a Heart"
 "One For Sorrow" (JRMX Club Mix)
 "Scared Of The Dark" (SoundFactory Paradise Anthem)
 "It’s The Way You Make Me Feel" (Shortland Remix)
 "Something In Your Eyes" (SoundFactory Paradise Anthem)
 "Better Best Forgotten" (Shortland Remix)
 "Chain Reaction" (Almighty Mix Radio Edit)
 "A Hundred Years Of Winter" (7th Heaven Club Mix)
 "Better The Devil You Know" (JRMX Remix)
 "Stomp" (Stomp'n Remix)
 "The Runner" (7th Heaven Extended Mix)

Notes
 Each solo version of the Platinum Collection has an alternative track list picked by each member of their favourite tracks along with solo artwork. Tracks 1–15, and 19-20 are the same on each solo version.  
 "Story of a Heart" is removed from each solo version.
 On streaming versions of the album, "Scared of the Dark" and "Deeper Shade of Blue" are switched in the track listing. The rest of the tracks stay in place.

Charts

Release history

References

2022 compilation albums
Steps (group) albums
Pop albums by British artists
Compilation albums by British artists
Pop compilation albums